Flavoplaca is a genus of crust-like or scaly lichens in the family Teloschistaceae. It has 28 species with a mostly Northern Hemisphere distribution.

Taxonomy
The genus was circumscribed in 2013 by Ulf Arup, Patrik Frödén and Ulrik Søchting, with Flavoplaca citrina as the type species. The genus formed a well-supported clade in molecular phylogenetic analysis. Flavoplaca species are closely related to Calogaya species that have lobes. There are other genera with roughly similar morphological features as Flavoplaca (examples include Polycauliona, Orientophila, Sirenophila, and Villophora), but they are genetically different and have different distributions. Arup and colleagues included 26 species in the genus; most were originally named as members of the genera Caloplaca or Lecanora.

Description
Flavoplaca species have a thallus that is either crust-like (crustose) or scaly (squamulose), sometimes with indistinct edges, and sometimes with lobes. They often have apothecia, and these are zeorine, meaning that the proper exciple (the ring-shaped layer surrounding the hymenium) is enclosed in the thalline exciple. Pycnidia can be present or absent; the conidia have a bacilliform to ellipsoid shape.

Four Flavoplaca species are lichenicolous; that is, they grow on other lichens. These are F. coronata (on saxicolous lichens), F. microthallina (on saxicolous lichens, commonly Hydropunctaria maura), F. oasis (on saxicolous lichens, particularly Bagliettoa calciseda), and F. polycarpa (on Bagliettoa). Only F. polycarpa has a truly lichenicolous mode of life; the others are facultatively lichenicolous, i.e., commonly collected from lichens but also known to grow on non-lichen substrates.

Species
Most Flavoplaca species occur in the Northern Hemisphere, and many are found in Europe. , Species Fungorum accepts 28 species of Flavoplaca:

Flavoplaca arcis 
Flavoplaca arcisproxima 
Flavoplaca austrocitrina 
Flavoplaca calcitrapa 
Flavoplaca citrina 
Flavoplaca communis 
Flavoplaca confusa 
Flavoplaca coronata 
Flavoplaca cranfieldii 
Flavoplaca dichroa 
Flavoplaca flavocitrina 
Flavoplaca geleverjae 
Flavoplaca granulosa 
Flavoplaca havaasii 
Flavoplaca kantvilasii 
Flavoplaca laszloana 
Flavoplaca limonia 
Flavoplaca lutea 
Flavoplaca marina 
Flavoplaca maritima 
Flavoplaca mereschkowskiana 
Flavoplaca microthallina 
Flavoplaca navasiana 
Flavoplaca nigromarina 
Flavoplaca oasis 
Flavoplaca ora 
Flavoplaca polycarpa 
Flavoplaca tavaresiana

References

Teloschistales
Teloschistales genera
Taxa described in 2013
Lichen genera